Nicole Immorlica (born November 26, 1978) is a theoretical computer scientist at Microsoft Research, known for her work on algorithmic game theory and locality-sensitive hashing.

Education and career
Immorlica completed her Ph.D. in 2005 at the Massachusetts Institute of Technology, under the joint supervision of David Karger and Erik Demaine. Her dissertation was Computing with Strategic Agents.

After postdoctoral research at Microsoft Research and at the Centrum Wiskunde & Informatica in Amsterdam, Immorlica took a faculty position at Northwestern University in 2008, and moved to Microsoft Research in 2012.

Service
In 2019, Immorlica was elected chair of SIGecom, the Association for Computing Machinery Special Interest Group on Economics and Computation.

References

External links
Home page

1978 births
Living people
American computer scientists
American women computer scientists
Theoretical computer scientists
Massachusetts Institute of Technology alumni
Northwestern University faculty
Microsoft Research people
American women academics
21st-century American women